Crenides or Krenides was an ancient Greek city located in Thrace, and later in ancient Macedonia located in the region between the river Strymon and the river Nestos. It was founded by colonists from Thasos in 360 BCE. Crenides was close to Mount Pangaion with its rich gold veins and to another Thasian colony, Datos. The two colonies provoked the Thracians but at the same time gave Philip II of Macedon the justification for penetrating the area and founding Philippi in 356 BCE. Philip intervened to protect the city when it was threatened by Thracians under Kersobleptes.

See also
Greek colonies in Thrace

References

Populated places in ancient Thrace
Populated places in ancient Macedonia
Former populated places in Greece
Thasian colonies
Athenian colonies
Greek colonies in East Macedonia